Remi Tsuruta (鶴田 玲美, born 18 April 1997) is a Japanese athlete. She competed in the women's 4 × 100 metres relay event at the 2020 Summer Olympics.

References

External links
 

1997 births
Living people
Japanese female sprinters
Athletes (track and field) at the 2020 Summer Olympics
Olympic athletes of Japan
Sportspeople from Kagoshima Prefecture
People from Kagoshima